Androstenediol dipropionate (brand names Bisexovis, Bisexovister, Ginandrin, Stenandiol), or 5-androstenediol 3β,17β-dipropionate, also known as androst-5-ene-3β,17β-diol 3β,17β-dipropionate, is a synthetic anabolic–androgenic steroid and an androgen ester – specifically, the dipropionate diester of 5-androstenediol (androst-5-ene-3β,17β-diol) – which has been marketed in Europe, including in Spain, Italy, and Austria.

See also
 List of androgen esters

References

Androgen esters
Androgens and anabolic steroids
Androstanes
Prodrugs
Propionate esters
World Anti-Doping Agency prohibited substances